In The Winter Dark is a 1988 novel by Australian author Tim Winton.

Synopsis 
The setting is a valley called the Sink, which is isolated and surrounded by forest. The people who come there are lonely, have troubles or are drawn by the land. The solitude is disturbed by a mysterious creature which kills livestock and exposes the hidden fears in everyone.

Reviews 
As reviewed at LibraryThing the theme of the book is, "the way you can't escape the past. Whatever you've done will come out. 'If only we hadn't so many things to hide, so many opportunities for fear to get us.'" The thing that is menacing the characters isn't external, it is within themselves. The book is suspenseful, ominous, intimate and claustrophobic.

The Independent on Sunday wrote that, 'Tim Winton's raw and vibrant language makes the senses jump... concentrated, passionate, invigorating writing'. The Washington Post calls the book, 'A major work by anyone's standards... mysterious, painful and beautiful'.

Film 
In 1998, a feature film adaptation of In the Winter Dark was released.

References

1988 Australian novels
Australian novels adapted into films
Fiction about animal cruelty
Novels by Tim Winton